Twelvemile Creek is a stream in the U.S. state of South Dakota.

Twelvemile Creek was named for its distance,  from Macy (an extinct town).

See also
List of rivers of South Dakota

References

Rivers of Davison County, South Dakota
Rivers of Hanson County, South Dakota
Rivers of Hutchinson County, South Dakota
Rivers of South Dakota